Der Hausgeist ("The House Spirit") is a German comedy television series that aired on the ZDF network from September 13, 1991, to February 3, 1993. It starred Susanne Uhlen, Stefan Behrens, Volker Lechtenbrink, Ursela Monn, Gabi Heinecke and Hans-Werner Bussinger.

See also
List of German television series

External links
 

1991 German television series debuts
1993 German television series endings
German comedy television series
German fantasy television series
German supernatural television series
German-language television shows
ZDF original programming